The 1995–96 Danish Cup was the 42nd installment of the Danish Cup, the highest football competition in Denmark.

Final

References

1995-96
1995–96 domestic association football cups
Cup